Pinellia ternata, crow-dipper, is a plant that is native to China, Japan, and Korea. However, it also grows as an invasive weed in parts of Europe (Austria, Germany) and in North America (California, Ontario, the northeastern United States). The leaves are trifoliate, and the flowers are of the spathe and spadix form that is typical of plants in the family Araceae.

Characteristics
The plant spreads by rhizomes, and there are also small bulblets (also known as bulbils) at the base of each leaf. Flowers are borne in spring.

Traditional medicine
This plant is toxic in raw form and must be processed.  Pinellia ternata is known as the herb effective in removing dampness-phlegm, one of the causes of obesity in traditional Chinese medicine.  One study found that high doses of Pinellia extract effects thermogenesis and fatty acid oxidation in Zucker rats.

Gallery

References

External links

Aroideae
Plants used in traditional Chinese medicine
Flora of China
Flora of Eastern Asia
Plants described in 1784